"I'm So Lonesome I Could Cry" is a song written and recorded by American country music singer-songwriter Hank Williams in 1949. The song has been covered by a wide range of musicians.

Authorship and production 

Various writers quoted Williams as saying he wrote the song originally intending the words be spoken rather than sung, as he had done on several of his Luke the Drifter recordings. According to Colin Escott's 2004 book: Hank Williams: A Biography, the inspiration for the song came from the title to a different song Williams spotted on a list of forthcoming MGM record releases. The song was recorded on August 30, 1949, at Herzog Studio in Cincinnati, Ohio.

Williams was backed by members of the Pleasant Valley Boys: Zeke Turner (lead guitar), Jerry Byrd (steel guitar) and Louis Innis (rhythm guitar), as well as Tommy Jackson (fiddle) and Ernie Newton (bass).

Controversy 
Music journalist Chet Flippo and Kentucky historian W. Lynn Nickell have both asserted that 21-year-old Kentuckian Paul Gilley wrote the lyrics, then sold them to Williams along with the rights, allowing Williams to take credit for it. Gilley also supposedly wrote the lyrics to "Cold, Cold Heart" and other hit country songs before drowning at the age of 27. The claims have not been widely accepted.

Release and reception 
The song was released as the B-side to the blues "My Bucket's Got a Hole in It", because up-tempo numbers were deemed more appropriate for the jukebox trade than melancholy ballads. The single reached number four on the country chart in 1949.

"I'm So Lonesome I Could Cry" has been identified with Williams's musical legacy, and has been widely praised. In the 2003 documentary The Road to Nashville, singer k.d. lang stated: "I think 'I'm So Lonesome I Could Cry' is one of the most classic American songs ever written, truly. Beautiful song."  In his autobiography, Bob Dylan recalled: "Even at a young age, I identified with him. I didn't have to experience anything that Hank did to know what he was singing about. I'd never heard a robin weep, but could imagine it and it made me sad." In its online biography of Williams, Rolling Stone notes:
In tracks like "I'm So Lonesome I Could Cry", Williams expressed intense, personal emotions with country's traditional plainspoken directness, a then-revolutionary approach that has come to define the genre through the works of subsequent artists from George Jones and Willie Nelson to Gram Parsons and Dwight Yoakam.

Rolling Stone ranked it number 111 on their list of the 500 Greatest Songs of All Time, the oldest song on the list, and number 3 on its 100 Greatest Country Songs of All Time.

Notable cover versions 
Many musical artists have covered the song:

 Among the most notable is a version by B. J. Thomas and the Triumphs, who took the song to number 8 on the Billboard Hot 100 in 1966.
 In 1972, Charlie McCoy's version charted at number 23 on Billboard Hot Country Songs chart.
 Leon Russell released a version in 1973, which brought him a modest hit at number 78 on the Hot 100.
 Elvis Presley recorded the song in 1973 in the show Aloha from Hawaii Via Satellite.
 Pittsburgh Steelers quarterback Terry Bradshaw recorded the song in 1975 and released it in 1976, advancing to number 17 on the country singles chart for two weeks. It broke into the Hot 100 at number 91.
 Jerry Lee Lewis released a cover in 1982, charting at number 43 on the Hot Country Songs chart.
 Amy Lee covered the song in 2012 for the live tribute album We Walk the Line: A Celebration of the Music of Johnny Cash.
 Volbeat released a cover in 2008 on their album Guitar Gangsters & Cadillac Blood.
 The song was also adapted for and featured in the science-fiction television series The Expanse

Chart performance

Hank Williams version 

Williams' version ranked No. 29 in CMT's 100 Greatest Songs in Country Music in 2003.

References

Sources 
 

1949 singles
1966 singles
1972 singles
1976 singles
Songs written by Hank Williams
Hank Williams songs
B. J. Thomas songs
Charlie McCoy songs
Jerry Lee Lewis songs
Terry Bradshaw songs
Leon Russell songs
Glen Campbell songs
Elvis Presley songs
Tommy James and the Shondells songs
Andy Williams songs
Grammy Hall of Fame Award recipients
Songs about loneliness
1949 songs
MGM Records singles